The Church of Saint Catherine or Chapel of Saint Catherine is a Catholic religious building located adjacent to the northern part of the Basilica of the Nativity in Bethlehem in the West Bank, Palestine. It works as a parish church and Franciscan monastery. There is a complex of caves underneath the church.

It is administered by the Latin Patriarchate of Jerusalem, follows the Roman Rite, and is included in the UNESCO World Heritage List since 2012 as part of the "Birthplace of Jesus" world heritage site.

History

Byzantine period
St Jerome's monastery was possibly located at the site of the medieval cloister, its foundations laying hidden under the current pavement laid by Barluzzi.

Crusader period
Augustinian monastery.

Mamluk period
A small chapel, located near the site of the current altar of St Catherine of Alexandria, was dedicated to the Alexandrine saint in 1347 as part of the Franciscan monastery. The church is first mentioned in the 15th century.

Late Ottoman period
The church in its current shape is the result of work from the 19th century. It is built in Neo-Gothic style. It was extended in 1881 with funds provided by Emperor Franz Joseph I of Austria-Hungary.

After World War II
It has since been modernized several times according to the approved liturgical trends after the Second Vatican Council (Concilium Vaticanum Secundum Oecumenicum). The Crusader-period cloister was restored in 1948 by Italian architect Antonio Barluzzi.

Connection to St Catherine
The medieval chapel was built at the alleged site of Jesus' apparition to St Catherine, where he announced her of her coming martyrdom.

Televised Christmas Mass
This is the church where the Latin Patriarch of Jerusalem celebrates Midnight Mass on Christmas Eve.

Gallery

See also
Roman Catholicism in Palestine

References

External links
Photos of St Catherine's Church at the Manar al-Athar photo archive

Roman Catholic churches in Bethlehem
Roman Catholic churches completed in 1881
1881 establishments in the Ottoman Empire
Christianity in Bethlehem
Church buildings in the Kingdom of Jerusalem
19th-century Roman Catholic church buildings